Marija Petrović may refer to:
 Marija Petrović (handballer), Serbian handball player
 Marija Petrović (basketball), Serbian basketball player
 Marija Petrović (chess player), Serbian chess player